Wayne Clifford Boden ( – 27 March 2006) was a Canadian serial killer and rapist active between 1969 and 1971. Boden killed four women, three in Montreal and one in Calgary, earning the nickname The Vampire Rapist for biting the breasts of his victims, and received four life sentences. Boden's was the first murder conviction in North America due to forensic odontological evidence.

Biography
Wayne Clifford Boden was born in 1948 in Dundas, Ontario. Boden attended Glendale Secondary School in Hamilton in the early to mid-1960s, where he was reportedly quiet, but muscular and played on the school senior football team.

Murders

Shirley Audette
On 3 October 1969, Shirley Audette was found dead at the rear of an apartment complex in downtown Montreal, Quebec. Although she was fully clothed, she had been raped and strangled, and savage bite marks were found on her breasts. There were no signs of bloody skin under the fingernails of the victim, which led one biographer to theorize that she did not struggle against her assailant. One of Audette's former boyfriends told the police that he believed that she got involved with a very dominant, attractive man because she was "getting into something dangerous" but she never mentioned the man's name. Audette's boyfriend had been at work on the night shift, while Boden, who lived next door, met Audette outside the building where she sat when she felt nervous.

Marielle Archambault
On 23 November, Marielle Archambault, a jewellery clerk, left work at closing time with a young man whom she introduced to her co-workers as "Bill", and remarked that she seemed happy and entranced by the man. When Archambault did not report for work the following morning, her employer went to check on her in her apartment to see if she was ill. Together with her landlady, they discovered her fully clad body on the couch. The room was tidy, but Boden had ripped her pantyhose and bra, raped her, and left bite marks on her breasts.

The police were able to find a crumpled photograph amid the wreckage of Archambault's apartment, which was readily identified as the mysterious "Bill" by her co-workers. However, despite this apparent break, the police were not successful in connecting the photograph to any known suspect, even through a police sketch based on the picture was distributed for publication in the newspapers. The photo turned out to be Archambault's dead father.

Jean Way
On 17 January 1970, Brian Caulfield, the boyfriend of Jean Way, 24, came to pick her up for a scheduled date at her apartment on Lincoln Street in downtown Montreal. When Way did not answer the door, he decided to come back a little later, but upon returning found the door unlocked. Caulfield found Way's naked body on the bed, with her breasts undamaged. Boden was most likely in Way's apartment when Caulfield was knocking at the door earlier that evening. An autopsy conducted by Dr. Jean-Paul Valcourt found two small fibers under the fingernails of her left hand, indicating thatcontrary to prior beliefthat Way had indeed struggled against Boden.

After Way's death, the resulting publicity from the murders caused a brief mass hysteria in Montreal, although this disappeared as Boden had fled the city and the murders stopped.

Elizabeth Anne Porteous
In Calgary, Alberta, a 33-year-old high school teacher named Elizabeth Anne Porteous did not report to work on the morning of 18 May 1971. Her apartment manager was called, who found her body on the bedroom floor. As with Marielle Archambault, her apartment showed considerable signs of a struggle, and Porteous had been raped and strangled. Her breasts were likewise mutilated with bite marks. Amid the wreckage, however, the police recovered a broken cufflink under the victim's body. In their investigation of the murder, the police were able to find out from two of her colleagues that she was seen at a stoplight riding in a blue Mercedes-Benz on the night she died; the car was reported as having a distinctive advertising bull-shaped decal in the rear window. A friend of the victim also informed police that she had been recently dating a man named "Bill", described as a "flashy" dresser with neat, short hair.

Arrest
The following day, on 19 May, the blue Mercedes was spotted by patrolmen, parked near the murder scene. Boden, a former fashion model, was arrested half an hour later as he went to his car. He told the police that he moved from Montreal a year previous and admitted that he had been dating Porteous and was with her on the night of the murder. When the broken cufflink was presented to him, he admitted its ownership. However, he insisted that Porteous was fine when he left her that night.

The police in Calgary were in possession of a copy of the photograph recovered from Archambaut's apartment and, as Boden resembled the man in the picture, they held him for suspicion in murdering Porteous. Police then turned their attention to the marks on the victim's breasts.

Odontological evidence
The police contacted Gordon Swann, a local orthodontist, to help prove that the marks on Porteous' breasts and neck were Boden's bite marks, with the intent to verify them as having been left by Boden. As there was nothing in Canadian literature on forensic odontology at the time, Swann wrote to the Federal Bureau of Investigation (FBI) in the United States, hoping for any information on the matter.

Swann received a reply from FBI Director J. Edgar Hoover, who directed him to England, where he met a man who had dealt with 20 or 30 cases regarding bite marks. Swann was able to get the information he needed and based on a cast made of Boden's teeth, he managed to demonstrate 29 points of similarity between the bite marks in Porteous' body and Boden's teeth.

Conviction
The evidence provided by Gordon Swann was sufficient for the jury of Boden's trial to find him guilty for the murder of Elizabeth Porteous and subsequently sentenced to life imprisonment. Boden was the first murderer to be convicted in North America based on odontological evidence.
Boden then returned to Montreal to face trial, where he confessed to three murders of Shirley Audette, Marielle Archambault, and Jean Way, and was sentenced to three additional life terms. Boden was sent to the Kingston Penitentiary in Kingston, Ontario, where he began serving his sentence on 16 February 1972. Boden was initially believed to be involved in the death of Norma Vaillancourt, a 21-year-old student killed on 23 July 1968, but denied involvement. In 1994, Raymond Sauve was convicted of Vaillancourt's death and sentenced to ten years in prison.

In 1977, Boden was granted a credit card by American Express five years into his life sentence, which he used while out on a day pass from prison in Laval while eating lunch with his social worker in the Kon Tiki restaurant at the Mount Royal Hotel in downtown Montreal. He went to use the washroom and escaped through the bathroom window. He was recaptured several days later at a bar on Mackay Street in downtown Montreal. Three prison guards were disciplined, and American Express conducted an internal investigation to find out how a prisoner serving a life sentence for murder managed to get a credit card.

Death
Boden died from skin cancer at Kingston General Hospital on 27 March 2006 after being confined in the hospital for six weeks.

See also
List of serial killers by country

References

External links
A Crime Library profile (incorrectly associates Boden to the Vaillancourt murder.)
Article by Kim Guttormson, Edmonton Journal, 31 March 2006
Coolopolis – a report with photos on Boden based on primary source documentation.
Crime Stories: The Vampire Rapist, Documentary (2006) via crimedocumentary.com / runtime: 45 minutes.
Richard Monaco and Bill Burt, The Dracula Syndrome, New York: Avon Books, 1993. 

1940s births
2006 deaths
Canadian escapees
Canadian people convicted of murder
Canadian people who died in prison custody
Canadian prisoners sentenced to life imprisonment
Canadian rapists
Canadian serial killers
Deaths from cancer in Ontario
Deaths from skin cancer
Escapees from Canadian detention
Male serial killers
People convicted of murder by Canada
Place of birth missing
Prisoners sentenced to life imprisonment by Canada
Prisoners who died in Canadian detention
Serial killers who died in prison custody
Vampirism (crime)
Violence against women in Canada